Sedgwick House may refer to:

in the United Kingdom
Sedgwick House, Cumbria, built 1868

in the United States
Maj. Gen. John Sedgwick House, Cornwall, Connecticut, listed on the National Register of Historic Places
Sedgwick House (Bath, New York), built 1840–1854, listed on the National Register of Historic Places